"Heatwave" is a song by German DJ and record producer Robin Schulz featuring vocals from American singer, rapper and songwriter Akon. The song was released as a digital download in Germany on 12 February 2016 as the fourth and final single from his second studio album Sugar (2015). The song was written by Thomas Troelsen, Aliaune Thiam and Bryan Nelson.

Music video
The music video for this song was released onto YouTube on 7 April 2016 and runs for a total length of three minutes and twenty-six seconds.

Track listing

Charts

Weekly charts

Year-end charts

Certifications

Release history

References

2015 songs
2016 singles
Akon songs
Robin Schulz songs
Songs written by Thomas Troelsen
Songs written by Akon